was a Japanese politician of the Liberal Democratic Party, a member of the House of Councillors in the Diet (national legislature). A graduate of Kansai University, he was elected to the House of Councillors for the first time in 2004 after serving in the assembly of Osaka Prefecture for four terms.

References

External links 
 Official website in Japanese.

1942 births
2021 deaths
Members of the House of Councillors (Japan)
Liberal Democratic Party (Japan) politicians
Kansai University alumni
People from Higashiōsaka